I Shall Never Forget is a 1983 Soviet drama film directed by Pavel Kadochnikov.

Plot 
Nurse Polina is trying to save the life of a soldier Fedor and for this, she has to sacrifice her blood. They are sent to the hospital. Time passes and he calls Polina his wife and goes to the front, gets captured, participates in battles in France. Returning home, Fedor finds out that Polina now has a child and she left.

Cast 
 Irina Malysheva
 Evgeniy Karelskikh
 Pavel Kadochnikov	
 Viktor Shulgin
 Gennadiy Nilov
 Lyubov Sokolova
 Elena Drapeko
 Anatoliy Rudakov
 Lyudmila Kupina
 Elektrina Korneeva-Levitan

References

External links 
 

1983 films
1980s Russian-language films
Soviet drama films
1983 drama films